Order of the Black Eagle (aka Black Eagle) is an American action B movie released in December 1987.  The film is a sequel to Unmasking the Idol, a 1986 spy film by the same director (Keeter), story-writer (Eaton), and screenplay writer (Behrens). Leonard Worth Keeter III directed the film in Shelby, North Carolina, at Earl Owensby Studios, and the surrounding area.

Plot 

Duncan Jax, played by Ian Hunter, must stop neo-Nazis from destroying communication satellites and awakening Hitler from a cryogenic sleep. Jax assembles a band of the dirtiest fighters in the world to do it.

Cast 
Interpol Spy Agency
 Ian Hunter — Duncan Jax, secret agent
 Charles King "Chuck" Bibby — Star, head of spy agency
 Jill Donnellan — Tiffany Youngblood, undercover agent, and Jax assistant
 Shangtai Tuan — Sato, secret agent gadget designer

Duncan Jax's mercenaries
 Anna Maria Rapagna – Maxie Ryder
 Joe Coltrane — Hammer
 James Eric — Jake, aka "Juice"
 Bill Gribble — cowboy
 Dean Whitworth — Bolt
 Terry James Loughlin — S.
 Typhoon — "Boon," the Baboon, Duncan's pet and sidekick
Special appearance
 Flo Hyman — Spike, knife-wielding mercenary

Neo-Nazi group, "Order of the Black Eagle"
 William T. Hicks — millionaire Baron Ernst von Tepisch, leader of a neo-Nazi group
 Wolfgang Linkman — Colonel Wilhelm Stryker, Nazi security chief

Rest of cast
 Gene Scherer — Dr. Kurtz
 Stefan Krayk — Dr. George Brinkmann, Jr., laser scientist
 Tony Ellwood — Hitler (cameo appearance)

Post production 

 Editor — Matthew Ernest Mallinson
 Assistant Editor — Lewis Andrew Schoenbrun
 Music — Dee Barton, original score composer and conductor

References

External links 
 Plot and review by Brian vs. Movies (blog)
 Plot and review (July 22, 2011)
 Library reference — 
 

1987 films
1980s spy action films
American spy action films
Ninja films
Films shot in North Carolina
Films shot in South Carolina
Cryonics in fiction
Films about Nazis
Cultural depictions of Adolf Hitler
American sequel films
Films directed by Worth Keeter
1980s English-language films
1980s American films